Chennampatti is a village in Madurai district, Tamil Nadu, India.

References

Villages in Madurai district